Richard Albert Mostardi (other sources give Mostardo) (born July 1, 1938) is a former American football player who played with the Cleveland Browns, Minnesota Vikings and Oakland Raiders. He played college football at the University of Charleston and Kent State University. He is a member of the Kent State Athletics Hall of Fame. He also has a son named Rich Mostardi.

References

1938 births
Living people
American football defensive backs
Charleston Golden Eagles football players
Kent State Golden Flashes football players
Cleveland Browns players
Minnesota Vikings players
Oakland Raiders players
Players of American football from Pennsylvania
People from Bryn Mawr, Pennsylvania
American Football League players